Empress Teimei can refer to:
 , also known as Sadako, empress consort of the Japanese Emperor Ichijō
 , later Empress Teimei (貞明皇后) of Japan (1884–1951), wife of Emperor Taishō